Southside Johnny and the Asbury Jukes are an American musical group from the Jersey Shore led by Southside Johnny. They have been recording albums since 1976 and are closely associated with Bruce Springsteen & The E Street Band. They have recorded or performed several Springsteen songs, including "The Fever" and "Fade Away". Springsteen has also performed with the band on numerous occasions and in 1991 guested on their  Better Days album. During the band's formative years Steven Van Zandt acted as the band's co-leader, guitarist, songwriter, arranger and producer while other E Streeters including Clarence Clemons, Max Weinberg, Garry Tallent, Ernest Carter, Patti Scialfa and Soozie Tyrell have all performed, toured or recorded with the Jukes. The band's horn section – the Miami Horns – has also toured and recorded with Springsteen.  More than one hundred musicians can claim to have been members of the Asbury Jukes, including Jon Bon Jovi who toured with the band as a special guest during 1990. Bon Jovi has also cited the band as an influence and Jukes' Bobby Bandiera and Jeff Kazee have also toured with Bon Jovi. Other notable band members include Mark Pender and Richie "La Bamba" Rosenberg who have played regularly with the Max Weinberg 7 on both Late Night with Conan O'Brien and The Tonight Show with Conan O'Brien.

History

Early years
Southside Johnny and Steven Van Zandt, the two prime movers behind the formation of the Jukes, began playing together in various bands during the early 1970s. These bands, initially based out of The Upstage Club at 702 Cookman Avenue in Asbury Park, New Jersey, were usually short lived and often included Bruce Springsteen and various future members of The E Street Band. Amongst the earliest of these bands was Funky Dusty & The Soul Broom, a short-lived 1970 band which also featured Garry Tallent and Bobby Williams (drums). The same quartet also acted as backing band for a local folksinger Jeannie Clark. At the time Van Zandt was also a member of Steel Mill while Southside had just left one of his formative bands, Maelstrom. Next came Steve Van Zandt & Friends, a January 1971 band that also included Springsteen, Tallent, Williams, and Danny Federici. By February 1971 Van Zandt and Southside, together with Tallent and David Sancious, were playing as Steve Van Zandt & The Big Bad Bobby Williams Band. In March 1971, Van Zandt and Southside also featured in a short-lived Springsteen band, The Friendly Enemies. The highlight of their brief existence was opening for The Allman Brothers. Other members of this band included Tallent, Sancious, Williams, and Vini Lopez. In April 1971, Van Zandt and Southside also began co-leading The Sundance Blues Band, a group whose line-up would also feature Springsteen, Lopez, Tallent, and Sancious. In May 1971, Springsteen also recruited all the members of The Sundance Blues Band to play in his very short-lived band, Dr. Zoom & The Sonic Boom. Among the many musicians to play with this group was Kevin Kavanaugh, a future Juke. Kavanagh grew up in Middletown, New Jersey and was a childhood friend of Van Zandt. They had also played together in a band called The Shadows. From July 1971, Van Zandt, Lopez, Tallent, and Sancious also began backing Springsteen as The Bruce Springsteen Band and they would eventually evolve into The E Street Band. Southside Johnny would also occasionally play with this band. 1972 would prove to be another active year for Van Zandt and Southside Johnny. As well as playing with The Sundance Blues Band, backing Springsteen, and performing as a duo, Southside Johnny & The Kid, together with Kavanaugh, they also played in bands such as Albee & The Hired Hands and the Bank Street Blues Band.

Blackberry Booze Band
By 1974, Steven Van Zandt was playing with Al Berger in The Dovells backing band and Southside Johnny began to play with the Blackberry Booze Band which Kenny Pentifallo had already been drumming for. It was this band that eventually evolved into the Asbury Jukes. The original BBB had been playing together since 1968 and by 1974 featured a line-up of  Paul Green (harmonica, vocals), Paul Dickler (guitar), David Meyers (bass) and Kenny Pentifallo (drums). They had established themselves as the house band at a new club, The Stone Pony. Green was the band's lead singer but he preferred to play harmonica.  Meanwhile, Southside Johnny was playing harmonica with the Bank Street Blues Band but had few opportunities to sing lead. Green and Southside Johnny effectively swapped bands and Southside Johnny soon emerged as the leader of BBB, firing Dickler and Meyers but keeping Pentifallo on the drums. He subsequently recruited Kevin Kavanaugh and Van Zandt, who in turn recruited Al Berger, and in June 1975, inspired by Little Walter & The Jukes they changed their name to the Asbury Jukes. The original Jukes line-up was then completed with the addition of Mexican American Carlo Novi (tenor sax) and Billy Rush (guitar)

The Miami Steve era
In July 1975, Steven Van Zandt joined Bruce Springsteen's E Street Band and subsequently accompanied him on the Born to Run tour. Meanwhile back in Asbury Park, the Jukes became Southside Johnny & the Asbury Jukes and continued to play as the house band at the Stone Pony. However Van Zandt maintained his association with the Jukes and produced a four-song demo at the Record Plant Studios that attracted the attention of Steve Popovich of Epic Records. This then led to Van Zandt producing their debut album, I Don't Want to Go Home, at the same studio. Van Zandt also wrote three songs for the album including "How Come You Treat Me So Bad?", which featured guest vocals from Lee Dorsey and the title track, which effectively became the band's signature tune. Other highlights on the album are two songs donated by Springsteen – "The Fever" and "You Mean So Much To Me". Clarence Clemons provided bass vocal on the former but is credited under the pseudonym Selmon T. Sachs while the latter was performed as a duet by Southside Johnny and Ronnie Spector.

During the 1970s, Van Zandt went on to produce two further albums with the Jukes. This Time It's For Real, released in 1977, saw Van Zandt write eight of the album's ten songs, including three co-written by Springsteen. It also featured guest appearances from The Drifters, The Coasters and The Five Satins. Their third album, Hearts Of Stone, released in 1978 was recorded without guest appearances and featured entirely original material. Van Zandt wrote seven of the nine songs including "Trapped Again",  co-written with  Southside Johnny and Springsteen. Springsteen also donated two further songs, the title track and "Talk to Me".

The band was also featured in the 1977 film Between the Lines which starred then unknown actors Jeff Goldblum, John Heard, Lindsay Crouse, Jill Eikenberry, and Stephen Collins. The band is shown performing "Sweeter Than Honey" and "Having a Party".

In 1979, Southside Johnny and the Asbury Jukes performed a homecoming concert in Asbury Park which was the subject of a documentary film directed and produced by Neal Marshad called Southside Johnny & the Asbury Jukes at the Asbury Park Convention Center. The film was first shown in January 1980 on Warner Cable's QUBE in Columbus, Ohio.

In August 1979, the band played at Knebworth Festival in England. The headline act at both their appearances at the festival, over two consecutive Saturdays on 4 and 11 August, were Led Zeppelin.

The Billy Rush era
1979 saw Southside Johnny & the Asbury Jukes undergo several important changes. Their first three studio albums had only been moderate commercial successes and they were subsequently dropped by Epic Records. His increasing commitments to Bruce Springsteen also saw Steven Van Zandt end his working relationship with the Jukes and this led to Billy Rush taking over as the band's co-leader and principal songwriter. The next three Jukes albums were all released on Mercury Records. The Jukes was recorded at Muscle Shoals Sound Studio and produced by Barry Beckett. This was then followed by Love is a Sacrifice and a double live album Reach Up and Touch the Sky. The latter two both saw Stephan Galfas help out with engineering and production and also featured a trio of backing singers – Patti Scialfa, Soozie Kirschner and Lisa Lowell. 1983's Trash It Up was released by Mirage Records and produced by Nile Rodgers while 1984's In the Heat saw Asbury dropped from the band's name. It also marked the end of Billy Rush’s association with the Jukes. After leaving the band, Rush went on produce for Taka Boom, Serge Gainsbourg and Kacy Crowley.

The Bobby Bandiera Era
Guitarist Bobby Bandiera replaced Rush in 1985. The band released At Least We Got Shoes in 1986 as Southside Johnny & the Jukes before becoming Southside Johnny & the Asbury Jukes again. In 1991 they released Better Days which yielded minor hits with "It's Been a Long Time" and "I've Been Workin' Too Hard" and included vocal contributions from Bruce Springsteen and Jon Bon Jovi. Bon Jovi even joined the band as a special guest on their 1990 tour.

The band released several more albums in the 1990s and 2000s and they changed membership several times.  their lineup includes keyboardist Jeff Kazee and bassist John Conte.

In 1987, the band was in the film Adventures in Babysitting.  They were featured in the college frat party scene singing two songs.

2000s

In 2010, the band released Pills and Ammo with songs written by Southside Johnny and Jeff Kazee. The Jukes continue to perform extensively throughout the northeast United States and annually in the UK and Europe.

In 2011, looking to expand his artistic opportunities, Southside Johnny and The Poor Fools were formed. Composed of musicians Jeff Kazee, John Conte, Tommy Brynes, and Soozie Tyrell, this acoustic-ish ensemble plays a wide range of music from Dylan, Mose Allison, Muddy Waters, NRBQ, Richard Thompson, Emmylou Harris, The Band, George Jones, and more, as well as some of the legendary Asbury Jukes material in a stripped down format.

In February 2013, Southside Johnny and The Poor Fools released their debut studio album entitled Songs From the Barn (recorded in Jon Bon Jovi's studio, a converted horse barn in New Jersey.) Consisting of twelve tracks, including six original songs written by John Lyon and Jeff Kazee, the recording also includes covers the band has been playing live.

In August 2015, Southside Johnny and the Asbury Jukes released their first new album in five years, called Soultime! The album is described as a "collection of vintage-sounding contemporary soul", garnered positive reviews  and the band began an extensive tour in fall 2015 in support of the album.

Members
Current
 Southside Johnny – lead vocals, harmonica (1975–present)
 Glenn Alexander – guitars, vocals (2010–present)
 Chris Anderson – trumpet, flugelhorn (1997–present)
 John Conte – bass (2008–present)
 John Isley – saxophone
 Jeff Kazee – piano, Hammond organ
 Neal Pawley – trombone
 Thomas "Goose" Seguso – drums (2010–present)

Former
 Steven Van Zandt – lead guitar, rhythm guitar (1975–1980)
 Billy Rush – lead guitar, rhythm guitar (1975–1986)
 Bobby Bandiera – vocals, lead guitar, rhythm guitar (1986–2010)
 Joel Gramolini – guitar
 Mick Seeley – guitar, keyboards
 Jon Bon Jovi – guitar (1990)
 Ricky Byrd – guitar
 Jack Callahan – guitar
 Ralph Notaro – guitar
 Billy Walton – guitar
 Al Berger – bass, guitar (1975-???)
 Gene Boccia – bass
 Steve Buslowe – bass
 George L. Ruiz – bass
 Garry Tallent – bass
 David Hayes – bass
 Muddy Shews – bass
 Kelly Tyrrel – bass
 Kenny Pentifallo – Drums/Bass Vocals (1974–1978)
 Steve Becker – drums (*7 November 1952; † 1 June 2014)
 Ernest Carter – drums
 Tom Major – drums
 David Beal – drums
 Joe Bellia – drums
 David Longworth – drums
 Chucki Burke – drums
 Kevin Kavanaugh – keyboards (*27 November 1951; † 4 June 2011)
 Wes Nagy – keyboards
 Rusty Cloud – keyboards
 Carlo Novi – tenor saxophone (1975-???)
 Bob Kalach – tenor saxophone
 Stan Harrison – tenor saxophone
 Jerry Vivno – tenor saxophone
 Frank Elmo – tenor saxophone
 Tony Aiello – tenor saxophone
 Joey Stann – tenor saxophone
 Rick Gazda – trumpet
 Deacon Earl Gardener – trumpet
 Mark Pender – trumpet
 Tony Pallagrosi – trumpet
 Bob Muckin – trumpet
 Mike Spengler – trumpet
 Danny Stiles – trumpet
 Al Torrente – trumpet
 Barry Danielian – trumpet
 Jim Brady – trumpet
 Tony Perruso – trumpet
 Don Harris – trumpet
 Eddie Manion – baritone saxophone
 Louie Parente – trombone
 Bob Ferrell – trombone
 Amedeo "Beef" Ciminnisi-trombone
 Dan Levine – trombone
 Richie "La Bamba" Rosenberg – trombone
 Patti Scialfa – backing vocals
 Soozie Kirschner – backing vocals
 Lisa Lowell – backing vocals
 14 Karat Soul – backing vocals

Discography

Studio albums
 Southside Johnny & The Asbury Jukes
 I Don't Want to Go Home (1976)
 This Time It's for Real (1977)
 Hearts of Stone (1978)
 The Jukes (1979)
 Love Is a Sacrifice (1980)
 Better Days (1991)
 Messin' With the Blues (2000)
 Going To Jukesville (2002)
 Into the Harbour (2005)
 Pills and Ammo (2010)
 Soultime! (2015)
 Southside Johnny & The Jukes
 Trash It Up (1983)
 In the Heat (1984)
 At Least We Got Shoes (1986)
 Southside Johnny
 Slow Dance (1988)
 Southside Johnny with La Bamba's Big Band
 Grapefruit Moon: The Songs of Tom Waits (2008)
 Southside Johnny and The Poor Fools
 Songs From the Barn (2013)

Live Recordings
 Southside Johnny & The Asbury Jukes
 Live at the Bottom Line (1976)
 Live: Reach Up and Touch the Sky (1981)
 Hearts Of Stone Part 1 Public Recording At Paris In France The 04/22/1989 (1991)
 Hearts Of Stone Part 2 Public Recording At Paris In France The 04/22/1989 (1991)
 All I Wants Is Everything - Public Recording In 1984 At Bayou Club Washington DC (1992)
 Live at the Paradise Theater (2000)
 From Southside to Tyneside (2008)
 1978: Live in Boston (2008)
 Hearts of Stone LIVE (2009)
 Men Without Women LIVE (2012)
 Live Bottom Line NYC 77 (2015)
 Live From E Street (EP) (2017)
 Southside Johnny
 Spittin' Fire (1997)
  Southside Johnny & Little Steven
 Unplugged Live 1993
 Unplugged vol. 2
 Talk To Me Radio Broadcast - 1991

Compilations
 Southside Johnny and the Asbury Jukes Havin' a Party With Southside Johnny (1979)
 The Best of Southside Johnny & The Asbury Jukes (1992)
 All I Want Is Everything – The Best of 1979 – 1991 (1993)
 Ruff Stuff (EP) (1995)
 Rockin’ With the Jukes (1998)
 Restless Heart (1998)
 More Ruff Stuff (EP) (2000)
 Superhits (2001)
 Found In a Closet (EP) (2003)
 Missing Pieces (2004)
 Collections (2006)
 Jukebox (2007)
 Fever! The Anthology 1976–1991 (2008)
 Ruff Stuff 3 (EP) (2008)
 Acoustic Ammo (EP) (2011)
 Playlist: The Very Best of Southside Johnny & The Asbury Jukes ('76-'80) (2013)
  The Fever--The Remastered Epic Recordings (2 CD) Original recording remastered (2017)

Singles & Remix
 Southside Johnny & The Jukes' Trash It Up - Divers Version Mix (1983)
 Get Your Body On The Job - Version Short & Long Version (1983)
 New Romeo - Dub Version (1984)
 Love Is The Drug - Long Version (1984)
 Captured'' - Long Version & Mix Version (1984)
Only available in Vinyl 45 Tour and 33 Tour

References

External links

 

Jersey Shore musical groups
Musical groups established in 1975
Musical groups from New Jersey
 
1975 establishments in New Jersey